Meramec Township is an inactive township in Crawford County, in the U.S. state of Missouri.

Meramec Township takes its name from the Meramec River. 
Its largest city is Steelville, which is also the county seat of Crawford County.

References

Townships in Missouri
Townships in Crawford County, Missouri